3,5-Diiodothyronine (3,5-T2) is an active thyroid hormone within the class of iodothyronines. It has two iodine atoms at positions 3 and 5 of its inner ring.

Biological effects
3,5-T2 is an active thyroid hormone. It stimulates the TR-beta receptor for thyroid hormones and thus increases energy expenditure. It has agonistic (thyromimetic) effects at myocardial tissue and pituitary, which results in 3,5-T2 suppressing TSH release. 3,5-T2 is an allosteric regulator of the cytochrome c oxidase, the complex IV of the electron transport chain. It increases its activity by preventing the interaction of adenosine triphosphate (ATP) as an allosteric inhibitor.

Clinical significance
In nonthyroidal illness syndrome 3,5-T2 concentrations are increased. This could explain why patients with low T3 syndrome don't benefit from substitution therapy with thyroid hormones.

References

External links 
 

Iodinated tyrosine derivatives
Thyroid
Human hormones
Hormones of the hypothalamus-pituitary-thyroid axis
Hormones of the thyroid gland